Bence Pávkovics (born 27 March 1997) is a Hungarian football player who currently plays for El Paso Locomotive in the USL Championship.

Career

Újpest
On 16 July 2016, Pávkovics played his first match for Újpest in a 0-2 loss against Budapest Honvéd in the Hungarian League.

El Paso Locomotive
Pávkovics sign with USL Championship club El Paso Locomotive on 27 January 2023.

Club statistics

Updated to games played as of 15 May 2022.

References

External links

1997 births
Living people
People from Mohács
Hungarian footballers
Hungary youth international footballers
Hungarian people of Serbian descent
Association football midfielders
Pécsi MFC players
Újpest FC players
Debreceni VSC players
El Paso Locomotive FC players 
Nemzeti Bajnokság I players
USL Championship players
Sportspeople from Baranya County
Hungarian expatriate sportspeople in the United States
Expatriate soccer players in the United States
Hungarian expatriate footballers